Minye Kyawswa (also spelled Minyekyawswa;  16 November 1567 – late December 1599) was heir apparent of Burma from 1593 to 1599, and viceroy of Ava from 1587 to 1593. For the last six years of his life, he was the deputy of his father King Nanda, who presided over the collapse of the Toungoo Empire. In December 1599, he betrayed his father, and defected to the forces led by Minye Thihathu II of Toungoo and Raza II of Arakan. But the promise of good treatment was not kept; the last crown prince of the Toungoo Empire was killed a few days later.

Ancestry
The prince was born to Crown Prince Nanda and his chief consort Hanthawaddy Mibaya  16 November 1567 in Pegu (Bago). He was the sixth child and the second son of the couple, and had six other full siblings.

Early life

The prince grew up in Pegu during the reign of his grandfather King Bayinnaung, who had founded the largest empire in Southeast Asia. After Bayinnaung died on 10 October 1581, his father Nanda succeeded without incident. Minye Kyawswa became second in line of succession behind his elder brother Mingyi Swa, the heir-apparent.

However, the days of the empire were numbered. The new king did not have the support of his major vassals, who ruled what used to be sovereign kingdoms just a few decades earlier. By 1584, Nanda faced serious rebellions in Ava (Upper Burma) and Siam. The king relied on Mingyi Swa to keep the empire intact. Minye Kyawswa was not a factor. Unlike other senior princes of the day, he did not take part in any of the early military campaigns—Chinese Shan States (1582–83), Ava (1584), and Siam (1584, 1586).

Viceroy of Ava

Accession
The prince's first major assignment came in September/October 1586. Governor Min Letya of Ava, whom Nanda appointed just two years earlier, had just died in office. The king appointed his second son by his chief queen viceroy of Ava with the title of Minye Kyawswa, effective —the date deemed propitious by the court astrologers. To help the young prince govern Upper Burma, the king also sent along a dozen senior seasoned officials led by Baya Yawda (as chief minister), and Let-Yway-Gyi Myin Hmu (as commander of the military).

In February 1587, Minye Kyawswa and his entourage arrived at Ava (Inwa). The new viceroy had a difficult task ahead of him: reestablish tighter control over the fractious vassal rulers throughout central and northern Burma, the Shan states and Manipur. The viceroyship appointment itself marked the end of an experiment by Nanda. Only two years earlier, the high king, who did not want another strong vassal ruler like the rebellious viceroy Thado Minsaw of Ava, experimented by appointing Min Letya only as a governor to administer the vast upcountry. The downside of this policy was that an administrator like Min Letya—even though he was a son of King Tabinshwehti—did not have much control over Ava's vassals, many of whom were sons of Bayinnaung. Probably as a result, Ava could not contribute much manpower to Pegu's war effort in Siam.

Reign
Minye Kyawswa's term proved tumultuous from the outset. The repeated failures in Siam were seriously eroding the power of the high king at Pegu. No vassal ruler was impressed by the 19-year-old viceroy. Just seven months into his term, in September 1587, a small Shan state of Inya revolted. The new administration at Ava was helpless, unable to organize a military force. Finally, his father had to send 4000 troops from Lower Burma, which took seven months to put down the rebellion.

Ava did get a better handle of the situation in the following years. In 1590, Minye Kyawswa was able to contribute the vast majority of the 10,000-strong army, raised to suppress a rebellion in the northern Shan state of Mogaung. But he still did not take part in the campaign. His younger brother Thado Dhamma Yaza, Viceroy of Prome, came up to take command of the army. (A 12-year-old Prince Natshinnaung also came to "command" a regiment.) The army went on to put down the rebellion by March 1591 but instabilities returned soon after the army left. This time, however, Minye Kyawswa needed to go to the front himself. He was explicitly asked to do so by Nanda, who was frantically directing all his efforts to defeat a Siamese invasion of the southern Tenasserim coast. In October 1591, Minye Kyawswa for the first time went to the front, leading an army of 8000 men, 600 horses and 60 elephants. After seven months of siege, the army broke through and took the city. The rebel chief of Mogaung was caught and executed.

The success at Mogaung won plaudits of the king. It was the only bright spot for Nanda. Not only had all four invasions of Siam gone badly, but Siam was now on counterattack, threatening the Tenasserim coast. In May 1592, Minye Kyawswa went to Pegu, and was showered with lavish presents by his father. It was probably the last time he saw his elder brother Mingyi Swa, who along with his father was planning another invasion of Siam. Perhaps because Upper Burma was still unstable, Minye Kyawswa did not contribute much manpower to the invasion effort.

Minye Kyawswa soon became the front runner to succeed Mingyi Swa, who fell in action in Siam in January 1593. Distrustful of potential rivals in Upper Burma, the king did not however appoint another viceroy or even a governor at Ava. He made Minye Kyawswa's deputies Baya Yawda and Let-Yway Myin Hmu as co-administrators, backed by a 3000-strong army.

Heir apparent
In January 1594, Minye Kyawswa returned to a greatly weakened Pegu. Its home base of Lower Burma had borne the brunt of the war effort in the past decade, and was now greatly depopulated. Able men had fled military service to become monks, indentured servants, private retainers or refugees in the nearby kingdoms. Yet, the new crown prince frantically set out to raise more men—again mainly from Lower Burma, branding men to facilitate identification, executing deserters, and forcing monks into the army. He soon clashed with Thado Dhamma Yaza, who openly disagreed with his tactics. Nanda was forced to intervene the quarrel between the brothers, officially releasing the conscripted men and seized property. But the damage was already done. Coercion proved self-defeating. With cultivators disappearing, rice prices in Lower Burma reached unheard of levels.

What followed was a series of revolts throughout the empire in the next three years. The great unraveling was initiated by a Siamese-backed rebellion in Moulmein (Mawlamyaing) in October/November 1594. Siamese forces led by King Naresuan proceeded to lay siege to Pegu in December. Towards the end of the siege, in April 1595, Prome revolted. It was followed by Lan Xang  November 1595. Upper Burma and other northern territories had been de facto independent, certainly since Minye Kyawswa was recalled to Pegu, if not earlier. Lan Xang briefly returned to the fold in 1596 with the sudden death of the rebel king Nokeo Koumane. But by April 1597, Toungoo and Lan Na had openly revolted. Others like Ava and Lan Xang did not declare outright independence but effectively broke away as well.

Pegu was powerless to do anything. By then, Nanda and Minye Kyawswa were just hanging onto two provinces (Pegu and the Irrawaddy delta) of Lower Burma. In 1598, the rebel state of Toungoo and the western coast kingdom of Arakan agreed to a joint attack on Pegu. Toungoo and Arakanese forces laid siege to Pegu in April 1599. Eight months into the siege, the city was starving, and much of the garrison had already deserted. Minye Kyawswa then got a secret offer from King Minye Thihathu II of Toungoo who promised to give him his daughter in marriage if he defected. Minye Kyawswa accepted the offer, and fled the city; Minye Thihathu then sent Minye Kyawswa to Toungoo (Taungoo) along with 30 servants.

Minye Kyawswa's defection greatly shocked Nanda. The king reportedly said that he was fighting only for his son, who had now betrayed him.

Death
Meanwhile, at Toungoo (Taungoo), the heir-apparent of Toungoo Natshinnaung, who had intensely disliked Nanda and Minye Kyawswa, ignored his father's promise, and ordered the execution of Minye Kyawswa. The fallen crown prince was 32.

Notes

References

Bibliography
 
 
 
 
 
 
 
 
 
 
 
 

Heirs apparent of Toungoo dynasty
1567 births
1599 deaths
People from Bago Region
Heirs apparent who never acceded